Doug Malone may refer to:

Doug Malone (Canadian football), 2011 Hamilton Tiger-Cats season
Doug Malone, character in 40 Guns to Apache Pass